Polynucleobacter sphagniphilus is an aerobic, chemo-organotrophic, non-motile, free-living bacterium of the genus Polynucleobacter.

The type strain was isolated from a small acidic bog pond located in Austria. In contrast to other Polynucleobacter type strains, for instance the type strain of P. duraquae, the strain inhabits and prefers acidic waters. The genome sequence of the strain was fully determined., The type strain dwells as a free-living, planktonic bacterium in the water column of a bog pond, thus is part of freshwater bacterioplankton.

References

External links
Type strain of Polynucleobacter sphagniphilus at BacDive -  the Bacterial Diversity Metadatabase

Burkholderiaceae
Bacteria described in 2017